Mark Bly (born 1949) is an American dramaturge, educator, and author. After graduating from Yale's Dramaturgy and Dramatic Criticism Program in 1980, Bly worked as a resident dramaturge – then a relatively new position in the United States. He held this position for several of the country's major regional theaters: the Guthrie, Yale Rep, Seattle Rep, Arena Stage, and the Alley. He was the first dramaturge to receive a Broadway dramaturgy credit for his collaboration with director Emily Mann on her play Execution of Justice (1986), During his career, Bly worked as a production dramaturge with a series of major theater artists including Doug Hughes, Garland Wright, Emily Mann and Moisés Kaufman, as well as on the world premieres of works by playwrights Suzan-Lori Parks, Sarah Ruhl and Rajiv Joseph.

In 1992, Bly returned to the Yale School of Drama to teach playwriting and dramaturgy. As a teacher and author, he rejected narrow definitions of the dramaturge's role in the theatre-making process, arguing for dramaturgy as an active, open, and, most of all, deeply-informed application of "The Questioning Spirit" (i.e., commitment to "an environment where everyone is free to ask questions" and "curiosity is at a premium") to the creative process.

In addition to editing and contributing to Yale Theater: American Production Dramaturgs (1986), a collection of interviews with the first generation of American dramaturges, Bly assembled and edited two volumes of his  Production Notebooks: Theater in Process (1996, 2001) – the first set of dramaturgy case studies published in North America. Bly's later writings include New Dramaturgies: Strategies and Exercises for 21st Century Playwriting (2019), a book detailing techniques for teaching playwriting  created by Bly for his students at Yale.

Bly's production dramaturgy, teaching, and writing have led others to regard him as a major influence in the emergence of dramaturgy as a field and profession in contemporary American theater.

Life and career 

Born in Sioux Falls, South Dakota, Bly attended University of Minnesota (BA, 1973), Boston College (MA, 1977), and the Yale School of Drama (MFA, 1980). As a resident dramaturge at the Guthrie Theater from 1981-1989, Bly worked on many productions of classics, including Peer Gynt (1983, directed by Liviu Ciulei); the Gorky-Gershwin musical Hang on to Me (1984, directed by Peter Sellars); The Misanthrope (1987, directed by Garland Wright) and Leon & Lena (and Lenz) (1987, directed by JoAnne Akalaitis).

Following his tenure at the Guthrie, Bly worked on the dramaturgy for several world and American premieres of new plays, including  director Dan Sullivan's world premiere of Herb Gardner's Conversations with My Father at Seattle Repertory Theatre (1991) with Liz Diamond, the world premiere of Suzan-Lori Parks's The America Play at Yale Repertory Theatre (1994) and The Public Theater (1994), and, with Molly Smith, the world premiere of Sarah Ruhl's trilogy Passion Play, a Cycle at Arena Stage, Washington, DC (2005). He served as Moisés Kaufman's dramaturge on the East Coast (Arena Stage, 2007) and West Coast (La Jolla Playhouse, 2008) world premieres of Kaufman's Beethoven-inspired 33 Variations, as well as for Kaufman's Broadway production of the same play starring Jane Fonda and Zach Grenier (2009).  For the Alley Theater in Houston, he served as director Rebecca Taichman's dramaturge for the world premiere production of Rajiv Joseph's Gruesome Playground Injuries (2009).

In addition to his teaching, Bly chaired the MFA Playwriting Program (1992-2004) at Yale and, from 1992 to 1997, co-chaired its Dramaturgy program. He was the board president for Literary Managers and Dramaturgs of the Americas (LMDA) from 2000 to 2005. With artistic director Gregg Henry, Bly, in 2011 , co-founded the international Kennedy Center Dramaturgy Intensive Workshop in conjunction with the National New Play Network playwriting workshop. From 2014 to 2017 he established and funded the LMDA Bly Creative Capacity Grant/Fellowship Awards to support international projects that advanced the practice of dramaturgy in innovative ways across disciplines.

In 2010, Bly received the Literary Managers and Dramaturgs of the Americas' (LMDA) Gotthold Ephraim Lessing Lifetime Achievement Award; in 2019, he was awarded the Kennedy Center American College Theater Festival Medallion for Lifetime Excellence in Dramaturgy.

Awards and recognition

Publications (Selected)

Productions (Selected)

References

1949 births
Living people
Theatre
Dramaturges